Gayrard is a French surname. Notable people with the surname include:
 (1923–2014), French politician
Raymond Gayrard (1807–1855), French sculptor, son of Raymond (père)
 (1777–1858), French sculptor, father of Raymond
Véronique Gayrard, French mathematician

See also
Gérard

French-language surnames